Robert McIlvenny (7 July 1926 – 15 May 2016), was a Northern Irish footballer who played as an inside forward in the Football League. He made 139 league appearances with Oldham Athletic where he scored 36 goals.

McIlvenny died on 15 May 2016 at Millbrook House in Exeter at the age of 89.

McIlvenny's older brother Paddy also played in the Football League. Their father, also a Paddy McIlvenny, was an Ireland international footballer.

References

External links
Bobby McIlvenny's Career

1926 births
2016 deaths
Association footballers from Belfast
Association footballers from Northern Ireland
Association football inside forwards
Colwyn Bay F.C. players
Merthyr Tydfil F.C. players
Oldham Athletic A.F.C. players
Bury F.C. players
Southport F.C. players
Barrow A.F.C. players
Yeovil Town F.C. players
English Football League players